Besnard Lake is a lake in the Canadian province of Saskatchewan,  north of Saskatoon and  west of La Ronge. It supports a large population of bald eagles that have been the subject of ongoing studies since the 1960s.

At a narrows it is crossed by a bridge carrying Highway 910. This road was completed in 1973 and increased access to recreational fishing. There are over 250 islands on the lake, and the lakebed is rocky, making navigation difficult but creating a good habitat for fish. There are cabins, campgrounds and fishing camps on the lake.

Besnard Lake is within the Churchill River drainage system. While much of the lake is in the Canadian Shield, its southern portion is in the boreal forest where the Mercer River brings nutrients which leads to healthy invertebrate populations that provide plenty of food for the fish which are the mainstay of the eagles' diet. They fish mainly for white sucker and cisco, and occasionally northern pike, walleye, and burbot. Compared to the nearby and similarly sized Nemeiben Lake, which is entirely on the shield, the eagle population has a higher density and stability.

Bald eagle studies 
The bald eagle community at Besnard Lake has been studied continuously for over 50 years following their discovery there by Jon Gerrard. In that time eagle population dynamics, behaviour, growth, and migration have been studied, resulting in the publication of more than 50 scientific papers and the 1988 book The Bald Eagle: Haunts and Habits of a Wilderness Monarch. Over 800 eagles have been banded, and have been found to winter mainly between Iowa and Missouri, Wyoming and Montana, but some have been found as far south as Texas, Arizona, and Southern California.

In the 1960s it was considered that bald eagles were rare in Canada away from the Atlantic and Pacific coasts. In 1966 Gerrard found 18 nests with 27 young in the area. A more extensive aerial survey of the region in 1974 found 14,000 eagles. Besnard Lake was found to be a perfect area to study bald eagles in these boreal breeding grounds. The lake has provided habitat for a stable population of about 100 eagles since the 1970s.

One discovery was that the sex of immature eagles could be accurately and efficiently determined by measuring the size of the foot and length of the culmen on the beak. This led to the discovery that the sex of the young seems to be regulated by the quantity of food available, with more females (which are larger than the males) hatching when food is plentiful. On other lakes where food is less plentiful a higher ratio of males hatch.

Besnard Lake Recreation Site 
Besnard Lake Recreation Site is a provincial recreation site on the south-western shore of Besnard Lake. Access is from Highway 910. There are two fishing lodges in the park at the lake. Besnard Lake Lodge has modern cabins, boat rentals, and guided fishing packages. Besnard Lake Camp has cabins, campsites, boat rentals, and guided fishing.

See also 
List of lakes of Saskatchewan

References

Further reading 

This 50-year study revolutionizes our understanding of bald eagles - Canadian Geographic

Lakes of Saskatchewan